Plava Laguna is  a Serbo-Croatian phrase meaning "blue lagoon". It is also the name of a tourist group based in Poreč in Istria, Croatia.

Notes 
The Bay of Poreč is a favorite holiday place of French film director Luc Besson, whose box-office hit The Fifth Element features a character named Plavalaguna (also a reference to star Milla Jovovich's first film Return to the Blue Lagoon.

References

External links 
 Plava laguna in Poreč
 Plava laguna diving in Poreč
http://home.case.edu/~agw4/diva/framer.htm

Companies of Croatia
Tourism in Croatia
Istria